Dame Vivienne Cox,  (born May 1959) is a British businesswoman, chairman of the supervisory board of Vallourec, the French multinational steel components company.

Cox was born in 1959 and worked for BP for almost three decades before being named as chairperson of the supervisory board of Vallourec, a French multinational steel components company. She is also a non-executive director of Pearson PLC and a commissioner at the UK's Airports Commission.

Since July 2016, Cox has been a non-executive director of GlaxoSmithKline. In July 2018, she became the first Chair of the Rosalind Franklin Institute.

Honours
Cox was appointed Commander of the Order of the British Empire (CBE) in the 2016 New Year Honours for services to the economy and sustainability and Dame Commander of the Order of the British Empire (DBE) in the 2022 New Year Honours for services to sustainability, and to diversity and inclusion in business.

References

1959 births
Living people
Dames Commander of the Order of the British Empire
British business executives
Date of birth missing (living people)
Place of birth missing (living people)
GSK plc people